Orkjärve Nature Reserve is a nature reserve situated in northern Estonia, in Harju County. It was established in 2005.

Nature reserve was established to protect Orkjärve Bog and Aude and Viisu mires.

Most of the protected area is under Orkjärve Bog. In the northern part of this bog, there is Lake Laanemaa (also known as Orkjärv).

References

External links

Nature reserves in Estonia
Saue Parish